Jerri Winters is an American jazz singer. She worked with Stan Kenton's orchestra from 15 February until 15 June 1952, recording several titles for Capitol Records, including "Adios," "All Because of You," and "She's a Comely Wench." Winters released several solo records, including 1955's Winter's Here on Fraternity Records (the first recording to be released by that label), 1957's Somebody Loves Me on Bethlehem Records, and 1962's Winters Again released on Charlie Parker Records.

Discography
Winter's Here (1955, Fraternity)
Somebody Loves Me (1957, Bethlehem)
Winters Again (1962, Charlie Parker)

With Stan Kenton 

Adios (arr. Bill Russo) 24 February 1952
All About Ronnie (arr. Johnny Richards) 20 March 1952
All Because of You (arr. Johnny Richards) 24 February 1952
Cinderella (arr. Johnny Richards) 24 February 1952
Don't Worry 'Bout Me (arr. Pete Rugolo) 24 February 1952
She's A Comely Wench (arr. Johnny Richards) 18 March 1952
Softly (arr. Johnny Richards) 19 March 1952
Yes (arr. Johnny Richards) 24 February 1952

References

External links
 
 Blog Post Discussing Jerri Winters

American jazz singers
Possibly living people
Year of birth missing
Bethlehem Records artists